Ben Brooks (born August 11, 1958) is a Republican former member of the Alabama Senate in the US, representing the 35th District and from November 2006 to December 2012. He stepped down after being elected a circuit court judge for Mobile County in November 2012 and before being sworn in January 2013.

References

External links 
 Senator Ben Brooks, Alabama State Legislature
 Project Vote Smart – Senator Ben Brooks (AL) profile
 Ben Brooks 2006 campaign contributions at Follow the Money

Alabama state senators
1958 births
Living people